Michael Woods may refer to:

Michael Woods (Australian politician) (1857–1934), member of the Queensland Legislative Assembly
Michael Woods (comics), American writer/editor of comic books
Michael Woods (cyclist) (born 1986), Canadian cyclist
Michael Woods (DJ), UK electronic music producer
Michael Woods (footballer) (born 1990), footballer for Hartlepool United
Michael Woods (Irish politician) (born 1935), Irish Fianna Fáil politician
Michael Woods (organist) (fl. 1565–1569), English organist
Michael Woods (The Only Way Is Essex)
Mike Woods (American football) (1954–2009), American football player
Mike Woods (Australian footballer) (born 1926), footballer for Melbourne
Mike Woods (speed skater) (born 1952), American Olympic speed skater
Michael Woods II (born 2000), American football wide receiver

See also
Michael Wood (disambiguation)
Woods (surname)